The president of the European Parliament presides over the debates and activities of the European Parliament. They also represent the Parliament within the European Union (EU) and internationally. The president's signature is required for laws initatied under co-decision and the EU budget.

Presidents serve 2.5-year terms, normally divided between the two major political parties. There have been 30 presidents since the Parliament was created in 1952, 17 of whom have served since the first parliamentary election in 1979. Three presidents have been women and most have come from the older member states.

Role in Parliament
The president chairs debates and oversees all the activities of the Parliament and its constituent bodies (ensuring the Parliament's rules of procedure are applied), in this the role is similar to that of a speaker in a national parliament. Below the president, there are 14 vice-presidents who chair debates when the president is not in the chamber. The president also chairs the meetings of the Bureau, which is responsible for budgetary and administration issues, and the Conference of Presidents, which is a governing body composed of the presidents of each of the parliament's political groups.

Position in the Union
The president represents Parliament in all legal matters and external relations, particularly international relations. When the European Council meets, the president addresses it to give the Parliament's position on subjects on the council's agenda. The president also takes part in Intergovernmental Conferences on new treaties. The president's signature is also required for the budget of the European Union and Union acts adopted under codecision procedure to be adopted. The president also chairs conciliation committees with the Council under these areas.

In most countries, the protocol of the head of state comes before all others. However, in the EU the Parliament is listed as the first institution, and hence the protocol of its president comes before any other European, or national, protocol. The gifts given to numerous visiting dignitaries depends upon the president. President Josep Borrell MEP of Spain gave his counterparts a crystal cup created by an artist from Barcelona which had engraved upon it parts of the Charter of Fundamental Rights among other things.

With the reorganisation of leading EU posts under the Lisbon Treaty, there was some criticism of each post's vague responsibilities. Ukrainian ambassador to the EU Andriy Veselovsky praised the framework and clarified it in his own terms: The President of the European Commission speaks as the EU's "government" while the President of the European Council is a "strategist". The High Representative specialises in "bilateral relations" while the European Commissioner for Enlargement and European Neighbourhood Policy deals in technical matters such as the free trade agreement with Ukraine. The Parliament's president meanwhile articulates the EU's values such as democratic elections in other countries.

Election

The president is elected by the members of Parliament for a two-and-a-half-year term, meaning two elections per parliamentary term, hence two presidents may serve during any one Parliamentary term. Since the 1980s, the two major parties in the Parliament, the European People's Party (EPP) and Party of European Socialists (PES), have had the custom of splitting the two posts between themselves. For example, in the 2004–2009 legislature the EPP supported the PES candidate for president and, when his term expired in 2007, the PES supported the EPP's candidate. This resulted in large majorities for presidents, although there are some exceptions: in the 1999–2004 legislature, under an EPP–Liberal deal, the president for the second half of the term was a Liberal, rather than a Socialist.

Starting from the 2009–2014 session of the Parliament the outgoing president presides over the election of the new president, provided that the outgoing president is re-elected as an MEP.  If the outgoing president is not re-elected as an MEP then one of the 14 vice-presidents takes up the role.  While the outgoing president or vice-president is in the chair, they hold all the powers of the president, but the only business that may be addressed is the election of the new president.

Before the ballot nominations are handed to the chair who announces them to Parliament. If no member holds an absolute majority after three ballots, a fourth is held with only the two members holding the highest number of votes on the previous ballot. If there is still a tie following this, the eldest candidate is declared elected.

A number of notable figures have been President of the Parliament and its predecessors. The first president was Paul-Henri Spaak, one of the founding fathers of the Union. Other founding fathers include Alcide de Gasperi and Robert Schuman. The two female presidents were Simone Veil MEP in 1979 (first president of the elected Parliament) and Nicole Fontaine MEP in 1999, both Frenchwomen. Jerzy Buzek, former Prime Minister of Poland and member of Solidarity Electoral Action, was elected as the first president from the central and eastern European countries which joined in the 2000s (more precisely, he is the first person from a country that joined the EU after 1986 to hold the post).

Oldest member

Prior to 2009, the "oldest member", the eldest MEP (similar to the Father of the House), presided over the chamber during the election of the president rather than the previous president. The member had all the duties of president but the only business that could be addressed was the election of the president.

In 2009, the Parliament's rules were changed so that the outgoing president (if re-elected as an MEP) or one of the outgoing vice-presidents would chair the first session of Parliament until a new president was elected.

Seventh European Parliament

2009
The two major factions of the European Parliament, the EPP and the S&D, have reached a formal agreement to share the presidency under the 2009–2014 term. Under the agreement, Jerzy Buzek would be president in the first half of the term and a S&D member would be elected in the second half (2012–2014) of the term. Martin Schulz (SPD, Germany), leader of the S&D group, was speculated as the likely nominee, and in the event he was elected on 17 January 2012.

Buzek's presidency is part of the usual People's Party – Socialist agreement to have one presidency each of the two during each parliament. For the 2009–2014 term Buzek gets the post for the first term of office of two and a half years, and someone from the Socialists will get it for the second. The 2004–2009 parliamentary term saw a great amount of co-operation between the two groups following on from the 1999–2004 term which saw an EPP-ELDR alliance. The Socialist candidate would be Martin Schulz who was unanimously nominated by the group. Diana Wallis (Liberal) and Nirj Deva (Conservative) also announced candidacies.

Meanwhile, Graham Watson, the leader of ALDE, stated he wished to challenge this system of carving up the post, and presented himself as a candidate. He made a point of running a public campaign, to contrast against the closed-doors agreement of Peoples Party-Socialists, which he claimed was the first such campaign to be run. Through this, he also stated he hoped to open up a debate on the role of the president and make the figure more dynamic, to counterbalance the growing power of the Presidency of the Council of the European Union. However, on 8 July 2009 Watson announced that he withdrew his candidacy thus leaving Buzek with only one opponent. The other official candidate was Eva-Britt Svensson, nominated from EUL-NGL. She campaigned with the slogan "a different voice". She was the first MEP from Sweden to candidate to the position.

In the first vote of the new Parliament Jerzy Buzek (EPP, Poland) was elected Parliament president, winning with 555 votes to 89 votes over his opponent Eva-Britt Svensson (EUL-NGL, Sweden).

Eighth European Parliament

2017
At the end of Martin Schulz's term, the presidency for the remainder of the eighth European Parliament (2014–2019) would have been due by convention to pass to an EPP member. However, the EPP–S&D agreement appeared broken, making it less certain that Antonio Tajani (EPP, Italy) would be elected president. The other contenders were Gianni Pittella (S&D, Italy), Guy Verhofstadt (ALDE, Belgium), Helga Stevens (ECR, Belgium), Eleonora Forenza (GUE/NGL, Italy) and Jean Lambert (Greens/EFA, UK). On 17 January 2017, Tajani was elected after four rounds of voting, following the withdrawal of Verhofstadt and declaration of support for the EPP candidate by the ALDE.

Ninth European Parliament

2019
The election of the President for the first half of the term of the Ninth European Parliament took place on 3 July 2019. David Sassoli (S&D, Italy) was elected as President in the 2nd round of voting.

2022
Following various periods of hospitalisation, David Sassoli died on 11 January 2022, one week before the expiry of his term. Roberta Metsola, as First Vice-President, became the acting President. 

The election to choose Sassoli's successor took place as previously scheduled on 18 January 2022. The candidates were the acting president Roberta Metsola (EPP, Malta), Alice Bah Kuhnke (Greens/EFA, Sweden), Kosma Złotowski (ECR, Poland; withdrew before the vote), and Sira Rego (The Left, Spain). Metsola was elected in the first round of voting, having secured an absolute majority of 458 out of votes cast. On her election, Metsola became the youngest ever President, the first Maltese person to hold the office, and the first woman President since 2002 (and only third woman president ever).

List of officeholders

The list below includes all presidents as far back as 1952. However official Parliamentary history does not see continuity between the Common Assembly and the post-1958 European Communities Parliamentary Assembly (the 50th anniversary of the European Parliament was celebrated in 2008, not 2002) so Jerzy Buzek would be the 24th president, not the 28th.

Presidents of the Common Assembly

Presidents of the Parliamentary Assembly

Presidents of the appointed Parliament

Presidents of the elected Parliament

Notes

Timeline

See also
Vice-President of the European Parliament
List of presidents of the institutions of the European Union
President of the European Council
President of the European Commission
Presidency of the Council of the European Union
President of the European Union
Speaker (politics)

References

External links
 President of the European Parliament – Official Website
 Duties of the President europarl.europa.eu
 Presidents of the European Parliament European Navigator
 Results of Presidential elections 1979–2007

 
+
+